Eureka Sound is a high Arctic waterway in Qikiqtaaluk, Nunavut, Canada. It separates Axel Heiberg Island from Ellesmere Island. Stor Island is located within the sound. Fort Eureka is nearby.

References 

Sounds of Qikiqtaaluk Region